Eureka Federal Savings was a San Carlos, California, based thrift, which operated primarily in the San Francisco Bay Area, with 35 branches at the thrift's height. Founded in 1890, it was one of the oldest savings and loan organizations in California. Being a savings and loan, it was known primary for interest bearing accounts, certificates of deposit, and home loans, before its eventual downfall.

Collapse
Like many other savings and loans of its time, Eureka Federal made risky investments in the 1980s, primarily in the Las Vegas, Nevada, casino market. Many of its investments soured, and the thrift was seized by the Federal Savings and Loan Insurance Corporation in 1988. It was sold to private investors, and became EurekaBank, a Federal Savings Bank.

Sponsorships
Eureka Federal Savings was the sponsor of the one-time Eureka Federal Savings Classic, a pro golf tournament on the Champions Tour, held in San Francisco in 1981.

Popular culture

The Eureka Federal Savings name was revived, temporarily, for filming of the 2008 film Milk. During filming on Castro Street, the U.S. Bank branch, the final owner of Eureka's assets, was temporarily rebranded as Eureka Federal Savings, for a certain scene in the movie.

Defunct banks of the United States
Banks established in 1890
1890 establishments in California
Banks disestablished in 1988
1988 disestablishments in California
Savings and loan crisis